Golinan (also Romanized as Golīnān; also known as Golīnāz) is a village in Kani Bazar Rural District, Khalifan District, Mahabad County, West Azerbaijan Province, Iran. At the 2006 census, its population was 368, in 58 families.

References 

Populated places in Mahabad County